Kaysersberg (Alsatian: Kaiserschbarig) is a historical town and former commune in Alsace in northeastern France. The name is German for Emperor's Mountain. The high fortress that dominates the town serves as a reminder of both its strategic importance and its warlike past. 

Kaysersberg lies in the canton of Sainte-Marie-aux-Mines, which itself is a subdivision of the Colmar-Ribeauvillé arrondissement. It was a separate commune until 1 January 2016, when it was merged into the new commune of Kaysersberg Vignoble together with nearby Kientzheim and Sigolsheim, and remains its seat. 

The town was first mentioned in 1227, when Frederick II, Holy Roman Emperor purchased the castle and gave orders to refortify it. During the Middle Ages, Kaysersberg, a member of the Décapole, prospered. In 1648, the city became a part of France, although most inhabitants continued to speak German. From 1871 to 1918 and (again from 1940 to 1944) Kaysersberg belonged to Germany.

In 2017 Kaysersberg was voted the  Village préféré des Français (Village favoured by the French). The inhabitants are called Kaysersbergeois.

Geography

Kaysersberg lies on the Route des Vins d'Alsace (Alsace "Wine Route"). Kaysersberg is north of Ammerschwihr and south of Riquewihr.

Population

Economy
The area around Kaysersberg is one of the finest wine-growing areas in Alsace. The first vines were brought here in the 16th century from Hungary, and wine production is still an important aspect of the town's economy today. Wine produced from the pinot gris variety is a local specialty.

Culture
Kaysersberg is a historic town, that has preserved many architectural monuments. These include:
Église Sainte-Croix, the oldest parts of which date form the 13th century
Hôtel de ville (town hall), 16th century, renaissance style
Oberhof chapel, 14th century
Saint-Michel chapel, 16th century
Château de Kaysersberg or Schlossberg, 13th century, partly ruined

Tourism
Besides the fact that Alsace wine is produced locally, there is the ruin of Kaysersberg Castle. The ruins of Château de Wineck in Katzenthal, Château de Lupfen-Schwendi and Château de Reichenstein in Kientzheim are within walking distance.

Notable people
Matthäus Zell (1477–1548), Protestant reformer
Albert Schweitzer (1875–1965), theologian, musician, philosopher, and physician
Anthony Bourdain (1956–2018), chef and writer, was found dead in Kaysersberg

Gallery

See also
Communes of the Haut-Rhin département

References

External links

 Town website

Décapole
Former communes of Haut-Rhin
Free imperial cities